Graswerth is a small, narrow island on the Rhine river near Koblenz, Germany, in the state of Rhineland-Palatinate. The two kilometer long island is uninhabited and can only be reached by row boat. It is a natural reserve, in which many rare species of birds live. The island is crossed by the A48 Autobahn via the Bendorfer Brücke (Bendorfer Bridge).

Graswerth, together with the Island Niederwerth, forms the Municipality of Niederwerth.

References

Uninhabited islands of Germany
River islands of Germany
Islands of the Rhine
Nature reserves in Rhineland-Palatinate
Landforms of Rhineland-Palatinate
Middle Rhine